James Merrill Cook (November 19, 1807 in Ballston, Saratoga County, New York – April 12, 1868 in Saratoga, New York) was an American businessman, banker and politician.

Career
From 1838 to 1856, he was the first President of the Ballston Spa Bank (later Ballston Spa National Bank) and also was the owner of cotton mills at Ballston Spa.

In 1842, 1843 and 1845, he was President of the Village of Ballston Spa. He was a delegate to the New York State Constitutional Convention of 1846.

He was a member of the New York State Senate (13th D.) from 1848 to 1851, sitting in the 71st, 72nd, 73rd, 74th New York State Legislatures.

At the state election in November 1851, he was elected New York State Treasurer on the Whig ticket by a margin of only 228 votes (200,693 for Cook; 200,465 for Welch), and took office on January 1, 1852. His Democratic opponent Benjamin Welch, Jr. contested the election successfully, and on November 20, 1852, Welch succeeded to the office for the remainder of the term.

He was New York State Comptroller from 1854 to 1855, defeated for re-election in 1855 by the American Party candidate Lorenzo Burrows.

From 1856 to 1861, he was Superintendent of the New York State Banking Department. He was again a member of the State Senate (15th D.) in 1864 and 1865.

Personal life

Cook  was married to Anna Cady.  Their daughter, Catherine Phillips Cook married George Sherman Batcheller.

Cook is buried in the Ballston Spa Village Cemetery.

Sources
 Official state canvass, in NYT on January 1, 1852
 Political Graveyard
 History of Saratoga County, New York by Nathaniel Bartlett Sylvester (1878)
Google Books The New York Civil List compiled by Franklin Benjamin Hough (pages 34, 36, 39 and 139; Weed, Parsons and Co., 1858)
 The Whig ticket in 1855, in NYT on September 29, 1855
 Re-appointed Bank Superintendent, in NYT on January 13, 1859

External links

1807 births
1868 deaths
New York (state) Whigs
19th-century American politicians
New York (state) state senators
New York State Comptrollers
American bankers
New York State Treasurers
Burials in Saratoga County, New York
19th-century American businesspeople